Nora Clearman England (November 8, 1946 – January 26, 2022) was an American linguist, Mayanist, and Dallas TACA Centennial Professor at the University of Texas at Austin. Her research focused on the grammar of Mayan languages and contemporary Mayan language politics.

Education and career 
England graduated from Bryn Mawr College with a B.A. in 1967 and the University of Florida in 1975 with an M.A. and a Ph.D. While there, she led a workshop and field visit to Iximche, attended by Linda Schele and Nicholai Grube.

After taking a post as a linguistics professor at the University of Texas in Austin in 2001, she became the founding director of the Center for Indigenous Languages of Latin America (CILLA). The University of Texas hosts England's Mayan Language Collection.

England's previous experiences include teaching positions at Mississippi State University and the University of Iowa, and training more than 100 Mayanists who have since gone on to work in various fields and are part of the first Maya generation able to receive substantial postsecondary education.

England died on January 26, 2022, at the age of 75.

Awards and honors
 1993-1998 MacArthur Fellows Program
 In 2017, England was inducted as a Fellow of the Linguistic Society of America.

Works
"Issues in comparative argument structure analysis in Mayan narratives'", Preferred argument structure: grammar as architecture for function, Editors John W. Du Bois, Lorraine Edith Kumpf, William J. Ashby, John Benjamins Publishing Company, 2003, 
"Mayan efforts toward language preservation", Endangered languages: language loss and community response, Editors Lenore A. Grenoble, Lindsay J. Whaley, Cambridge University Press, 1998, 
"Control and Complementation at Kusaal", Current approaches to African linguistics, Volume 4, Editor David Odden, Walter de Gruyter, 1987, 
 A grammar of Mam, a Mayan language, University of Texas Press, 1983, 
"Space as a Mam Grammatical Theme", Papers in Mayan linguistics, Editor Nora C. England, Dept. of Anthropology, University of Missouri-Columbia, 1978,

References

Bibliography

External links
 "Nora C. England", Scientific Commons
 

2022 deaths
1946 births
Linguists from the United States
University of Texas at Austin faculty
University of Iowa faculty
Mayanists
American Mesoamericanists
Women Mesoamericanists
Linguists of Mesoamerican languages
20th-century Mesoamericanists
MacArthur Fellows
Women linguists
Fellows of the Linguistic Society of America